Strikeforce: Evolution was a mixed martial arts event to be held by the Strikeforce on December 19, 2009 in San Jose, California at the HP Pavilion at San Jose. The event aired live on Showtime in the US, and live on SuperChannel in Canada.

Background
Robbie Lawler was expected to face Benji Radach on the card, however Radach was not able to get medical clearance to start training in time for the fight. Radach was replaced by Trevor Prangley; however, Prangley suffered a knee injury while training for the bout and had to withdraw from the fight as well. On December 16, it was announced that Lawler would not be competing on the card as a suitable replacement could not be found on such short notice.

Strikeforce newcomer Bryan Travers was expected to fight Daisuke Nakamura but was forced to withdraw due to an undisclosed injury. Justin Wilcox took his place on the fight card.

The Bobby Stack vs. David Douglas bout was cancelled. Douglas, who took the fight on a week's notice, reportedly had difficulty with his weight cut and was hospitalized after having issues holding fluids down.

The event drew an estimated 341,000 viewers on Showtime.

Results

Reported payout 
The following is the payout to the fighters as reported to the California State Athletic Commission. It does not include sponsor money or "locker room" bonuses often given by Strikeforce.

Scott Smith: ($55,000, no win bonus) def. Cung Le: ($150,000)
Gilbert Melendez: ($55,000, no win bonus) def. Josh Thomson: ($30,000)
Ronaldo Souza: ($65,000 includes $10,000 win bonus) def. Matt Lindland: ($50,000)
Muhammed Lawal: ($20,000 includes $10,000 win bonus) def. Mike Whitehead: ($30,000) ^
Antwain Britt: ($10,000 includes $5,000 win bonus) def. Scott Lightly: ($5,000)
Justin Wilcox: ($5,000, no win bonus) def. Daisuke Nakamura: ($200)
Alexander Crispim: ($4,000 includes $2,000 win bonus) def. AJ Fonseca: ($2,000)

^ Muhammed Lawal was reportedly fined 10 percent of his purse for splashing a sponsors energy drink around the cage. The CSAC's initial report did not include information on the penalty.

See also
 Strikeforce (mixed martial arts)
 List of Strikeforce champions
 List of Strikeforce events
 2009 in Strikeforce

References

Evolution
2009 in mixed martial arts
Mixed martial arts in San Jose, California
2009 in sports in California